Epic TV is an Indian television channel that airs action, drama, comedy and narrative non-fiction and fictional programming with a focus on Indian history, folklore and epic genre. Launched by In10 Media Pvt. Ltd. on 19 November 2014, a company owned by Anand Mahindra, it airs programmes in Hindi. Aditya Pittie, CEO of Pittie Group is the Managing Director of Epic TV. 

Some of its programmes like Raja, Rasoi Aur Anya Kahaniyaan; Kahi Suni; Dharmakshetra; Sanrachana have been added to Netflix. The slogan of the channel is "Soch Se Aage"(means Ahead of Thought).

Their digital platform named Epic ON was launched in early 2017 with most shows available.

The company has revealed a vision of organising and building itself as a media network, with new ventures across every touch-point of the content life-cycle that would consolidate under the banner of IN10 Media. As part of its expansion plans, the company also announced the launch of two new television channels – Gubbare TV (a kids channel) and Ishara TV.

Shows

Fiction
 Daanav Hunters
 Dariba Diaries
 Dharmakshetra
  Kalyug: Ek Aarambh
 Roz Sunday
 Siyaasat
 Stories by Rabindranath Tagore
 Time Machine
 Yam Kisi Se Kam Nahin

Non-Fiction
 Adrishya
 Animals in Mythology
 Back to Flashback with Javed Jaffrey
 Bharat - Rhythm of a Nation by Sadhguru (Acquired)
 Bharat Ki Awaaz
 Cultural Heritage India (Acquired)
 DeepTalks by Deep Trivedi (Acquired)
 Devlok with Devdutt Pattanaik (3 Seasons)
 Ekaant (2 Seasons & Sarhad Paar Special Episode)
 Epic Explorer
 Epic IQ Challenge
 Epic Ke Dus (2 Seasons)
 Epic Khoj
 Epicpedia
 Epic Tales of Love
 Glory to God (Acquired)
 Hit The Road India (Acquired)
 Indian Martial Arts - Ek Itihas
 Indipedia
 Jaane Pehchaane with Javed Akhtar
 Journeys in India (Acquired)
 Kahi Suni
 Kalyug - Ek Aarambh
 Khwaabon Ka Safar with Mahesh Bhatt
 Kissa Currency Ka
 Once More with Javed Jaffrey
 Lootere - Bandits of British India (3 Seasons)
 Lost Recipes
 Made in India
 Mid Wicket Tales with Naseeruddin Shah
 Raja Rasoi Aur Andaaz Anokha (2 Seasons)
 Raja, Rasoi Aur Anya Kahaniyaan (4 Seasons)
 Rakkt (2 Seasons)
 Regiment Diaries (2 Seasons)
 Road Less Travelled (Acquired)
 Sampatti Aur Sauda - Tales of Trade
 Sanrachna
 Sharanam - Safar Vishwas Ka (2 Seasons)
 The Creative Indians (Acquired)
 The Great Escape
 Tyohaar Ki Thaali
 Umeed India
 Way Back Home (Acquired)
 Wild Wild India (Acquired)
 Wilderness Days (Acquired)
 Jai Hanuman (Acquired)
 Mahabharat (Acquired)
 Mahabharat Katha (Acquired)
 Shree Ganesh (Acquired)
 Upgraded Full 202 or 404 error

Documentaries
 A Tent, a Truck & Talkies
 Air Battle of Srinagar
 Andamans - Jewels of the Sea (Acquired)
 Ayodhya - The Home Coming
 Balasinor - Rediscover India's Dinosaurs
 Beehad
 Curry Pow (Acquired)
 Cyber Yoddha (Acquired)
 Drishti - Documentaries on Epic (2 Seasons, Acquired)
 Ghaat Ghaat Ka Paani
 Hai Junoon
 Himalayan Misfits
 Jallianwala Bagh - Punjab Da Dil (2 Part Series)
 Janani (Acquired)
 Jungle Ke Baahubali (2 Part Series, Acquired)
 Kashmir Ki Virasat
 Killer Squadron
 Life Zara Hatke
 Love for the Game (Acquired)
 Naga - The Eternal Yogi (Acquired)
 Nagaland - The Hornbill Festival & Songs of Japfu (2 Part Series, Acquired)
 Nanak Naam Chardi Kala (4 Part Series)
 Nandadevi (Acquired)
 Raghu Rai - An Unframed Portrait
 Rampath (Acquired)
 Rupa's Boutique
 Sentinels of the Snow
 Superman of Malegaon
 The 1965 Indo-Pakistan War
 The Art Of Shantiniketan (Acquired)
 The Elephant Whisperer and Maya Memsaheb (Acquired)
 The Pad Piper (Acquired)
 The Royal Enfield Story
 Turning Point at Tololing
 Vijay Diwas - The Fall of Dhaka
 YKT, Mumbai (Acquired)
 Zindagi Ab Milee Dobara - Celebrating the Golden Years

Short Series
 7 Secrets from Hindu Calendar Art
 7 Secrets of Vishnu
 Alfaazon Ki Buniyad
 Anu Club - Amar Chitra Katha (Acquired)
 Banaras
 Buddha Sutra
 Devlok Mini
 Epicgrams
 Epified
 Go Ganges (Acquired)
 Khattey Meethey Guppey
 Kissa Currency Ka
 Indian Martial Arts - Shastra Ka Shastra
 Itihas Ki Thaali Se
 Mahabharata (Epified)
 My Geeta by Devdutt Pattanaik
 Pehli
 Samagri, Sampatti Aur Sauda
 Sharanam Faith Diaries (2 Seasons)
 Silsila Cinema Ka
 Supandi and Friends - Amar Chitra Katha (Acquired)
 The Krishna Story (Epified)
 Tyohaar Ki Thaali Recipe Special
 Umeed India Specials

References

External links
 Official website

Hindi-language television channels in India
Television channels and stations established in 2014
2014 establishments in India
Television channels and networks about history
Television stations in Mumbai
IN10 Media Network